The Grumman HU-16 Albatross is a large, twin–radial engined amphibious seaplane that was used by the United States Air Force (USAF), the U.S. Navy (USN), and the U.S. Coast Guard (USCG), primarily as a search and rescue (SAR) aircraft. Originally designated as the SA-16 for the USAF and the JR2F-1 and UF-1 for the USN and USCG, it was redesignated as the HU-16 in 1962. A new build G-111T Albatross with modern avionics and engines was proposed in 2021 with production in Australia to commence in 2025.

Design and development
An improvement of the design of the Grumman Mallard, the Albatross was developed to land in open-ocean situations to accomplish rescues. Its deep-V hull cross-section and keel length enable it to land in the open sea. The Albatross was designed for optimal  seas, and could land in more severe conditions, but required JATO (jet-assisted takeoff, or simply booster rockets) for takeoff in  seas or greater.

Operational history

Most Albatrosses were used by the U.S. Air Force (USAF), primarily in the search and rescue (SAR) mission role, and initially designated as SA-16. The USAF used the SA-16 extensively in Korea for combat rescue, where it gained a reputation as a rugged and seaworthy craft. Later, the redesignated HU-16B (long-wing variant) Albatross was used by the USAF's Aerospace Rescue and Recovery Service and saw extensive combat service during the Vietnam War. In addition, a small number of Air National Guard air commando groups were equipped with HU-16s for covert infiltration and extraction of special forces from 1956 to 1971. Other examples of the HU-16 made their way into Air Force Reserve rescue and recovery units prior to its retirement from USAF service.

The U.S. Navy also employed the HU-16C/D Albatross as an SAR aircraft from coastal naval air stations, both stateside and overseas. It was also employed as an operational support aircraft worldwide and for missions from the former Naval Air Station Agana, Guam, during the Vietnam War. Goodwill flights were also common to the surrounding Trust Territory of the Pacific Islands in the early 1970s. Open-water landings and water takeoff training using JATO was also conducted frequently by U.S. Navy HU-16s from locations such as NAS Agana, Guam; Naval Station Guantanamo Bay, Cuba; NAS Barbers Point, Hawaii; NAS North Island, California, NAS Key West, Florida; NAS Jacksonville, Florida, and NAS Pensacola, Florida, among other locations.

The HU-16 was also operated by the U.S. Coast Guard as both a coastal and long-range open-ocean SAR aircraft for many years until it was supplanted by the HU-25 Guardian and HC-130 Hercules.

The final USAF HU-16 flight was the delivery of AF Serial No. 51-5282 to the National Museum of the United States Air Force at Wright-Patterson AFB, Ohio, in July 1973 after setting an altitude record of 32,883 ft earlier in the month.

The final US Navy HU-16 flight was made 13 August 1976, when an Albatross was delivered to the National Museum of Naval Aviation at NAS Pensacola, Florida.

The final USCG HU-16 flight was at CGAS Cape Cod in March 1983, when the aircraft type was retired by the USCG.  The Albatross continued to be used in the military service of other countries, the last being retired by the Hellenic Navy (Greece) in 1995.

The Royal Canadian Air Force operated Grumman Albatrosses with the designation "CSR-110".

Civil operations

In the mid-1960s the U.S. Department of the Interior acquired three military Grumman HU-16s  from the U.S. Navy and established the Trust Territory Airlines in the Pacific to serve the islands of Micronesia.  Pan American World Airways and finally Continental Airlines' Air Micronesia operated the Albatrosses serving Yap, Palau, Chuuk (Truk), and Pohnpei from Guam until 1970, when adequate island runways were built, allowing land operations.

Many surplus Albatrosses were sold to civilian operators, mostly to private owners. These aircraft are operated under either Experimental-Exhibition or Restricted category and cannot be used for commercial operations, except under very limited conditions.

In the early 1980s, Chalk's International Airlines owned by Merv Griffin's Resorts International had 13 Albatrosses converted to Standard category as G-111s.  This made them eligible to be used in scheduled airline operations.  These aircraft had extensive modification from the standard military configuration, including rebuilt wings with titanium wing spar caps, additional doors and modifications to existing doors and hatches, stainless steel engine oil tanks, dual engine fire extinguishing systems on each engine, and propeller auto feather systems installed.  The G-111s were operated for only a few years and then put in storage in Arizona.  Most are still parked there, but some have been returned to regular flight operations with private operators.

Satellite technology company Row 44 bought an HU-16B Albatross (registration N44HQ) in 2008 to test its in-flight satellite broadband internet service. Named Albatross One, the company selected the aircraft for its operations because it has the same curvature atop its fuselage as the Boeing 737 aircraft for which the company manufactures its equipment. The plane purchased by Row 44 was used at one time as a training aircraft for space shuttle astronauts by NASA. It features the autographs of the astronauts who trained aboard the plane on one of the cabin walls.

In 1997, a Grumman Albatross (N44RD), piloted by Reid Dennis and Andy Macfie, became the first Albatross to circumnavigate the globe. The 26,347 nmi flight around the world lasted 73 days, included 38 stops in 21 countries, and was completed with 190 hours of flight time. In 2013 Reid Dennis donated N44RD to the Hiller Aviation Museum.

Since the aircraft weighs over 12,500 pounds, pilots of civilian US-registered Albatross aircraft must have a type rating. A yearly Albatross fly-in is held at Boulder City, Nevada, where Albatross pilots can become type rated.

Proposed new build
Amphibian Aerospace Industries in Darwin, Australia, acquired the type certificate and announced in December 2021 that it planned to commence manufacturing a new version the Albatross from 2025. Dubbed the G-111T, it would have modern avionics and Pratt & Whitney PT6A-67F turboprop engines, with variants for passengers, freight, search and rescue, coastal surveillance, and aeromedical evacuation.

Variants

XJR2F-1 - Prototype designation, two built
HU-16A (originally SA-16A) - USAF version
HU-16A (originally UF-1) - Indonesian version
HU-16B (originally SA-16B) - USAF version (modified with long wing)
SHU-16B (modified HU-16B for Anti-Submarine Warfare) - export version
HU-16C (originally UF-1) - US Navy version
LU-16C (originally UF-1L) - US Navy version
TU-16C (originally UF-1T) - US Navy version
HU-16D (originally UF-1) - US Navy version (modified with long wing)
HU-16D (originally UF-2) - German version (built with long wing)
HU-16E (originally UF-2G) - US Coast Guard version (modified with long wing)
HU-16E (originally SA-16A) - USAF version (modified with long wing)
G-111 (originally SA-16A) - civil airline version derived from USAF, JASDF, and German originals
CSR-110 - RCAF version
G-111T - proposed new builds with modern avionics and turboprop engines.

Operators

Argentine Air Force - 3 aircraft.
Argentine Naval Aviation - 4 aircraft.

Brazilian Air Force

 International Test Pilots School
Royal Canadian Air Force

Chilean Air Force

Republic of China Air Force

 German Navy

 Hellenic Air Force

Indonesian Navy
Indonesian Air Force
Airfast Indonesia
Dirgantara Air Service
Pelita Air

Italian Air Force   

 Japan Maritime Self-Defense Force

Royal Malaysian Air Force

Mexican Navy

 Royal Norwegian Air Force

 Pakistan Air Force

Peruvian Air Force

Philippine Air Force

Portuguese Air Force

Spanish Air Force

 Royal Thai Navy

 United States Air Force
 United States Coast Guard
 United States Navy

Aircraft on display

HU-16A
AF Ser. No. 51-0006 - Strategic Air and Space Museum in Ashland, Nebraska
AF Ser. No. 51-0022 - Pima Air and Space Museum adjacent to Davis-Monthan AFB in Tucson, Arizona
AF Ser. No. 51-7144 - Museum of Aviation, Robins AFB, Georgia
AF Ser. No. 51-7163 - Castle Air Museum adjacent to the former Castle AFB, Atwater, California
AF Ser. No. 51-7176 - Coast Guard Air Station Clearwater, Florida:  It was previously at the Pate Museum of Transportation in Cresson, Texas, until its disassembly and relocation to CGAS Clearwater for restoration.  It is currently marked as USCG 1023.
AF Ser. No. 51-7193 - Maryland Air National Guard Museum, Warfield Air National Guard Base, Baltimore, Maryland
AF Ser. No. 51-7195 - Yanks Air Museum, Chino, California
 MM50-179 - Italian Air Force Museum, Vigna di Valle, Italy 
HU-16A (Indonesian version)
 
 IR-0117 – On display at Dirgantara Mandala Museum, Sleman Regency, Special Region of Yogyakarta, Indonesia
 IR-0220 – On storage in Husein Sastranegara International Airport, Bandung, West Java, Indonesia: It was displayed during Bandung Airshow 2017.
 Unknown – On display at Abdul Rachman Saleh Air Force Base, Malang, East Java, Indonesia.
HU-16B
 
 BS-02 - Museo Nacional de Aeronáutica de Argentina, at Moron, Buenos Aires, Argentina
 ex-BS-03 - Museo Aviación Naval, Buenos Aires, Argentina. Displayed as Argentine Naval Aviation 4-BS-3.
AF Serial No. 51-5282, at the National Museum of the United States Air Force, Wright-Patterson AFB, Ohio:  This was USAF's last operational HU-16. On 4 July 1973, it established a world record for twin-engined amphibians when it reached 32,883 feet and was transferred to the Air Force Museum two weeks later.
AF Ser. No. 51-7181, then BuNo 151265  - U-Tapao Royal Thai Navy Airfield, Sattahip, Chonburi Province, Thailand Former USAF and USN aircraft in Royal Thai Navy markings, now bearing registration 151265 and displayed as a gate guardian since the early 1990s.
HU-16C
BuNo 137928 Hemisphere Dancer  - Universal Studios, Orlando, Florida Former USN aircraft in civilian markings, previously owned by musician and pilot Jimmy Buffett
BuNo 137932 - Hiller Aviation Museum, San Carlos, California, N44RD formerly owned by Reid W. Dennis.
HU-16E
AF Ser. No. 51-7209 - Aerospace Museum of California, former McClellan AFB, Sacramento, California
AF Ser. No. 51-7216 - Floyd Bennett Field, New York City, New York
AF Ser. No. 51-7228 - New England Air Museum, Windsor Locks, Connecticut
USCG 7236 - National Museum of Naval Aviation, NAS Pensacola, Florida
AF Ser. No. 51-7245, then USCG 7245   - Pacific Coast Air Museum, Santa Rosa, California  Originally served in USAF, transferred to USCG circa 1957-58.
AF Ser. No. 51-7247, then USCG 7247 - Coast Guard Air Station Elizabeth City, North Carolina.
AF Ser. No. 51-7250, the USCG 7250 - Coast Guard Air Station Cape Cod, Massachusetts
AF Ser. No. 51-7251 - Dyess Linear Air Park, Dyess AFB, Texas
AF Ser. No. 51-7254 - Jimmy Doolittle Air & Space Museum, Travis AFB, Fairfield, California
AF Ser. No. 52-1280 - Kirtland AFB, Albuquerque, New Mexico.
USCG 1293 - March Field Air Museum, March ARB, Riverside, California.
USCG 2129 - Battleship Memorial Park, Mobile, Alabama

Accidents and incidents
On 24 January 1952, SA-16A Albatross, 51-001, c/n G-74, of the 580th Air Resupply Squadron (described as a Central Intelligence Agency air unit), on cross-country flight from Mountain Home AFB, Idaho, to San Diego, California, suffered failure of the port engine over Death Valley. The abandoned SA-16 crashed into Towne Summit mountain ridge of the Panamint Range west of Stovepipe Wells with the starboard engine still running. The wreckage is still there.
On 16 May 1952, a U.S. Navy Grumman Albatross attached to the Iceland Defense Force crashed on Eyjafjallajökull in Iceland. Due to bad weather conditions, rescuers did not make it to the crash site until two and a half days later. One crew member was found dead in the wreckage, but the other four were not found despite extensive search. Evidence on scene suggested that they had tried to deploy the emergency radio, but most likely failed due to very poor weather conditions, and then tried to walk down the glacier.  In 1964, partial remains of one of the crewmember along with an engraved wedding ring were found at the rim of the glacier. On 20 August 1966, the remains of the three remaining crew members were found at a similar location.
On 18 May 1957, U.S. Coast Guard HU-16E Albatross, Coast Guard 1278, stalled and crashed during a JATO demonstration during the Armed Forces Day display at Coast Guard Air Station Salem. The pilot and another crewman were killed. The stall was caused by pilot error.
On 22 August 1957, U.S. Coast Guard HU-16E Albatross, Coast Guard 1259, crashed during takeoff at Floyd Bennett Field, killing 4 of the 6 crew on board. The aircraft had just completed an inspection in which the control columns were removed and inspected for fatigue cracks. Although not proven, it is believed that poor maintenance during the re-installation of the control columns led to the crash.
On 3 July 1964, U.S. Coast Guard HU-16E Albatross, Coast Guard 7233, was lost along with all five crew members as it returned from a search for a missing fishing boat. Two days later, the wreckage was found on a mountainside,  from its base at Air Station Annette, Alaska.
On 18 June 1965, on the first Operation Arc Light mission flown by B-52 Stratofortresses of Strategic Air Command to hit a target in South Vietnam, two aircraft collided in the darkness. Eight crew were killed, but four survivors were located and picked up by an HU-16A-GR Albatross amphibian, AF serial number 51-5287. The Albatross was damaged on take-off by a heavy sea state, and those on board had to transfer to a Norwegian freighter and a Navy vessel, the aircraft sinking thereafter.
On 9 January 1966, a Republic of China HU-16 carrying three mainland Chinese naval defectors was shot down by communist MiGs over the Straits of Formosa, just hours after they had surrendered their landing ship and asked for asylum. The Albatross was attacked just 15 minutes after departing the island of Matsu on a  flight to Taipei. According to a U.S. Defense Department announcement, the attack was a swift—and perhaps intentional—retribution for the communist sailors who killed seven fellow crew members during their predawn escape to freedom.
On 23 April 1966, a Royal Canadian Air Force Grumman CSR-110 Albatross (9302) serving with No. 121 Composite Unit (KU) at RCAF Station Comox, BC crashed on the Hope Slide near Hope, BC. It was the only RCAF Albatross loss. Five of the six crew members died (Squadron Leader J. Braiden, Flying Officer Christopher J. Cormier, Leading Aircraftsman Robert L. McNaughton, Flight Lieutenant Phillip L. Montgomery, and Flight Lieutenant Peter Semak). Flying Officer Bob Reid was the sole survivor. A portion of the wreckage is still visible and can be hiked to.
On 5 March 1967, U.S. Coast Guard HU-16E Albatross, Coast Guard 1240, c/n G-61, out of Coast Guard Air Station St. Petersburg, Florida, deployed to drop a dewatering pump to a sinking  yacht, Flying Fish, in the Gulf of Mexico off of Carrabelle, Florida. Shortly after making a low pass behind the sinking vessel to drop the pump, the flying boat crashed a short distance away, with loss of all six crew. The vessel's crew heard a loud crash, but could see nothing owing to fog. The submerged wreck was not identified until 2006.
On 15 June 1967, U.S. Coast Guard HU-16E Albatross, Coast Guard 7237, was based at Coast Guard Air Station Annette Island, in Alaska. The crew was searching near Sloko Lake, British Columbia, Canada, for a missing light plane. The pilot began following the river up to Sloko Lake, intending to turn around at the lake and fly back out of the valley. The co-pilot called for a right turn, but for some reason, the plane went left. According to reports, the co-pilot shouted, “Come right! Come right!” The plane hit the mountain, and burst into flames. The three observers in the back were able to get clear of the wreckage, and reported seeing an intense fire engulf the front half of the aircraft. Pilot Lt. Robert Brown, co-pilot Lt. David Bain, and radio operator AT2 Robert Striff, Jr., however, were killed. The wreckage can still be seen on the side of the mountain in Atlin Provincial Park.
The airframe broke in two, killing two crew immediately and injuring four others, with one dying in the hospital several days later.
On 21 September 1973, U.S. Coast Guard HU-16E Albatross, Coast Guard 2123, was lost over the Gulf of Mexico. The crew was dropping flares over a search area when one flare ignited inside the aircraft, incapacitating the pilots, which led the aircraft to enter an uncontrollable spin. All seven on board were killed.
On 23 January 1986, Indonesian Air Force HU-16A Albatross number IR-0222 crashed into the water at Makassar harbor during an attempted emergency landing. Five out of 8 crew were killed in the accident. The wreckage also blocked the harbor and delaying a Pelni liner from docking.
On 5 November 2009, Albatross N120FB of Albatross Adventures crashed shortly after take-off from St. Lucie County International Airport, Fort Pierce, Florida. An engine failed shortly after take-off; the aircraft was damaged beyond economic repair.

Specifications (HU-16B)

See also

References

Further reading

External links

Historical Aircraft page on Northrop Grumman Web Site
 HU-16 history, including other designations
 The Grumman Albatross Site
 Summary at Coast Guard Historian's site

U-016 Albatross
1940s United States military utility aircraft
Flying boats
Amphibious aircraft
High-wing aircraft
Aircraft first flown in 1947
Twin piston-engined tractor aircraft